Occupy Comics: Art & Stories Inspired by Occupy Wall Street is a three-issue comic book anthology series published by Black Mask Studios in 2013. Funded on Kickstarter, the series articulates themes of the Occupy Wall Street movement through comics as well as fund-raises on behalf of the protesters.

As Bleeding Cool described it:

Wired explained the perceived relationship between Occupy Wall Street and art:

History

Mission
The project was officially announced by organizational spearhead Matt Pizzolo in Wired Magazine on October 13, 2011, several weeks after the occupation of Zuccotti Park began on September 17, 2011.

According to Wired:

Kickstarter campaign
Occupy Comics launched on Kickstarter November 9, 2011 with a minimum funding goal of US$10,000 and a roster of 30 professional artists and writers, including Charlie Adlard, Marc Andreyko, Kevin Colden, Molly Crabapple, J.M. DeMatteis, Joshua Dysart, Brea Grant, Joe Keatinge, George Krstic, Joseph Michael Linsner, B. Clay Moore, Steve Niles, Laurie Penny, Matt Pizzolo, Steve Rolston, Riley Rossmo, Douglas Rushkoff, Tim Seeley, Simon Spurrier, and Ben Templesmith.

Shortly after the Kickstarter campaign launched, Wired released a follow-up article which explained the project's funding goals and strategy:

Early in the campaign, the project got an unexpected boost when Frank Miller attacked Occupy Wall Street in a controversial and polarizing blog post.

As the campaign closed in on its funding goal, 13 additional contributors were added to the roster, including Vito Delsante, Dan Goldman, Amanda Palmer, Darick Robertson, Mark Sable, and Salgood Sam.

The campaign passed its funding goal and was guaranteed its budget on November 20, 2011, 11 days in on its 30-day funding period.

Shortly after passing its funding goal, six additional contributors were added to the roster, including Mike Allred, Shannon Wheeler, Eric Drooker, Ryan Ottley, Dean Haspiel, Guy Denning, and David Lloyd.

In the final week of its Kickstarter campaign, Alan Moore joined the roster.

Although not an official reunion, the participation of Alan Moore and David Lloyd was considered significant to many observers of the Occupy movement, as the duo's V for Vendetta originated the Guy Fawkes mask that has become emblematic of the movement. Moore and Lloyd have not worked together since V for Vendetta was completed in 1989.

Alan Moore further boosted Occupy Comics' profile when, during an interview with Honest Publishing, he responded to Frank Miller's attack on the Occupy movement. The conflict led to mainstream news coverage of Occupy Comics in The Huffington Post, Deadline Hollywood, MTV, Entertainment Weekly.

On December 9, 2011, the Occupy Comics Kickstarter campaign ended with $28,640 raised from 715 backers, earning 286% of its funding goal.

Public release and formation of Black Mask Studios

On March 20, 2012, it was announced that Occupy Comics would not be released through an existing comic book publisher, instead a new company called Black Mask Studios would be formed to release the project.

According to Comic Book Resources:

Wired reported that Steve Niles (30 Days of Night) and Brett Gurewitz (guitarist-songwriter Bad Religion, owner Epitaph Records) joined with Pizzolo to found Black Mask:

On June 12, 2012, Black Mask Studios opened its webstore and officially released Occupy Comics #1 with the announcement that Pulitzer Prize-winner Art Spiegelman, Bill Ayers, Ryan Alexander-Tanner, Jimmy Palmiotti, and Matt Bors had joined the Occupy Comics roster.

Spiegelman told Wired:

On September 17, 2012, the one-year anniversary of Occupy Wall Street, Occupy Comics #2 was released to the project's Kickstarter backers and via the Black Mask Studios website. The cover featured a new and iconic illustration by V for Vendetta artist David Lloyd pitting his seminal character V against the Wall Street Charging Bull.

Lloyd told Wired:

Contributors

 Charlie Adlard (The Walking Dead)
 Ryan Alexander-Tanner (To Teach: The Journey, in Comics)
 Mike Allred (Madman)
 Marc Andreyko (Manhunter)
 Bill Ayers (co-founder Weather Underground, To Teach: The Journey, in Comics)
 Matt Bors (War Is Boring)
 Susie Cagle (Notes on Conflict, arrested at Occupy Oakland)
 Mike Cavallaro (Parade (with Fireworks), The Life and Times of Savior 28)
 Kevin Colden (I Rule the Night, Grimm's Fairy Tales)
 Molly Crabapple (Dr. Sketchy's)
 Tyler Crook (Petrograd, B.P.R.D.)
 Vito Delsante (Superman, FCHS)
 J.M. DeMatteis (Justice League, Spider-Man: Kraven's Last Hunt, Imaginalis)
 Guy Denning (painter)
 Eric Drooker (Flood!)
 Troy Dye (Shrek, Puss in Boots, The Goblin Chronicles)
 Joshua Dysart (Swamp Thing, The Unknown Soldier)
 Zoetica Ebb (Biorequiem)
 Joshua Hale Fialkov (I, Vampire, Echoes)
 Allen Gladfelter  (Cars (comics), Penguins of Madagascar (comics), Strongman, Intrepid Events Presents)
 Dan Goldman (Shooting War, 08: A Graphic Diary of the Campaign Trail)
 Jenny "Devildoll" Gonzalez-Blitz (Coffin Factory art collective)
 Brea Grant (We Will Bury You, Suicide Girls comic)
 Zane Grant (We Will Bury You, Suicide Girls comic)
 Joe Harris (Ghost Projekt, Spontaneous)
 Dean Haspiel (American Splendor)
 Megan Hutchison (An Aurora Grimeon Story: Will-O-the-Wisp)
 Joe Keatinge (Hell Yeah, Glory, Brutal)
 Tom Kelesides (Shrek, Puss in Boots, The Goblin Chronicles)
 Ales Kot (upcoming projects w/ Image Comics & DC Ent)
 George Krstic (Star Wars: The Clone Wars, Megas XLR)
 Jonathan Swifty Lang (Feeding Ground)
 Joseph Michael Linsner (Dawn)
 David Lloyd (V for Vendetta)
 Patrick Meaney (Grant Morrison: Talking With Gods)
 Mark L. Miller (Luna, Nanny & Hank)
 Caleb Monroe (Batman: Fearless, Hunter's Fortune)
 Alan Moore (V for Vendetta, Watchmen, League of Extraordinary Gentlemen, From Hell, Promethea)
 B. Clay Moore (Hawaiian Dick, Superman Confidential)
 Jerem Morrow (Drive-In Horrorshow, Kingdom Suicide)
 Amancay Nahuelpan-Bustamante (Hijos de P)
 Steve Niles (30 Days of Night, Batman: Gotham County Line, Criminal Macabre)
 Ryan Ottley (Invincible)
 Amanda Palmer (The Dresden Dolls)
 Jimmy Palmiotti (The Pro, Jonah Hex)
 Laurie Penny (Penny Red)
 Matt Pizzolo (Godkiller)
 Darick Robertson (Transmetropolitan, The Boys)
 Steve Rolston (Ghost Projekt, Queen & Country)
 Riley Rossmo (Proof, Cowboy Ninja Viking)
 Douglas Rushkoff (Testament, media theorist)
 Mark Sable (Two-Face: Year One, Rift Raiders, Unthinkable)
 Salgood Sam (Dream Life, RevolveR One, Revolution on the Planet of the Apes)
 Tim Seeley (Hack/Slash, Witchblade)
 Art Spiegelman (Maus)
 Simon Spurrier (2000 AD, X-Men: Curse of the Mutants)
 Ben Templesmith (30 Days of Night, Fell)
 Shannon Wheeler (Too Much Coffee Man)
 Anna Wieszczyk (Godkiller, Lucid)
 Ronald Wimberly (MF GRIMM: Sentences)

See also

References

External links
 Kickstarter Funding Page
 Official Website
 Official Strategic Blueprint

Kickstarter-funded publications
Occupy Wall Street